Mollahəsənli (also, Mollagasanli and Molla-Gasanly) is a village and municipality in the Masally Rayon of Azerbaijan.  It has a population of 776.

References 

Populated places in Masally District